"Blood" is a song by British post-punk revival band Editors from their 2005 debut album, The Back Room. It was released 11 July 2005 as the third single from the album and was re-released on 19 June 2006. It was in very limited release with the CD limited to 5000 copies whilst the 10-inch single was deleted on day of release and was only available through pre-ordering. Over the two formats, they contain two cover songs (originally by Talking Heads and R.E.M.) and two remixes of The Back Room track "Camera" from Jason Spaceman and Paul Oakenfold.

Track listings
 7-inch (SKX79)
 "Blood"
 "Forest Fire"

 CD (SKCD792)
 "Blood"
 "Let Your Good Heart Lead You Home"

 Maxi-CD (SKCD79)
 "Blood"
 "Heads in Bags"
 "Blood" (The Freelance Hellraiser editorial)

Re-issue
 10-inch (SKX87)
 "Blood"
 "Road to Nowhere" (Napster Session)
 "Camera" (obscured by J Spaceman)

 CD (SKCD87)
 "Blood"
 "Orange Crush" (R.E.M. cover)
 "Camera" (Oakenfold Remix)
 "Blood" (video)

References

2005 songs
2006 singles
Editors (band) songs
Song recordings produced by Jim Abbiss
Songs written by Chris Urbanowicz
Songs written by Edward Lay
Songs written by Russell Leetch
Songs written by Tom Smith (musician)